A miserable cake is a type of almond sponge cake that is a traditional Belgian recipe. The cake is filled with pudding made by whisking hot sugar syrup into an egg white foam, known as a pâte à bombe. The cake base is made from almonds, known as a biscuit joconde.

See also
 List of cakes
 Foam cake

References

Belgian cuisine
Sponge cakes
Almond desserts